Baine Harbour is a Canadian community in the province of Newfoundland and Labrador northeast of Marystown.

History 
In 1911 it had one store, one church and one hotel. The way office was established in 1883. The first way master was Lemuel Roberts. The first postmaster was W. Rodway in 1949. It was incorporated as a "government community" in 1970.

Demographics 

See also
List of cities and towns in Newfoundland and Labrador

References

Populated coastal places in Canada
Towns in Newfoundland and Labrador